Church of St. Nicholas is a temple of the Serbian Orthodox Church located in Romanovci in the municipality of Gradiška, Republika Srpska. It belongs to the Eparchy of Banja Luka. It is dedicated to Saint Nicholas of Myra.

It is a national monument of Bosnia and Herzegovina.

References 

Churches in Bosnia and Herzegovina